The Torneo Apertura 2007 was the football (soccer) tournament that opened the season in the Paraguayan first division in the year 2007.

The tournament began on February 16 with the participation of 12 teams, with a two-legged all play all system. The winner was Sportivo Luqueño, which ended a drought of championships of 54 years. 

By winning the Apertura, Luqueño also secured a spot for the Copa Libertadores 2008 and the right to play in the national championship final against the Clausura 2007 winner.

Positions

Results

{| class="wikitable" style="text-align:center; float:left; margin-right:1em;"
|-
!colspan=3 |Matchday 1
|-
!width="170"|Home Team
!width="60"|Result
!width="170"|Away Team

{| class="wikitable" style="text-align:center; float:left; margin-right:1em;"
|-
!colspan=3 |Matchday 2
|-
!width="170"|Home Team
!width="60"|Result
!width="170"|Away Team

{| class="wikitable" style="text-align:center; float:left; margin-right:1em;"
|-
!colspan=3 |Matchday 3
|-
!width="170"|Home Team
!width="60"|Result
!width="170"|Away Team

{| class="wikitable" style="text-align:center; float:left; margin-right:1em;"
|-
!colspan=3 |Matchday 4
|-
!width="170"|Home Team
!width="60"|Result
!width="170"|Away Team

{| class="wikitable" style="text-align:center; float:left; margin-right:1em;"
|-
!colspan=3 |Matchday 5
|-
!width="170"|Home Team
!width="60"|Result
!width="170"|Away Team

{| class="wikitable" style="text-align:center; float:left; margin-right:1em;"
|-
!colspan=3 |Matchday 6
|-
!width="170"|Home Team
!width="60"|Result
!width="170"|Away Team

{| class="wikitable" style="text-align:center; float:left; margin-right:1em;"
|-
!colspan=3 |Matchday 7
|-
!width="170"|Home Team
!width="60"|Result
!width="170"|Away Team

{| class="wikitable" style="text-align:center; float:left; margin-right:1em;"
|-
!colspan=3 |Matchday 8
|-
!width="170"|Home Team
!width="60"|Result
!width="170"|Away Team

{| class="wikitable" style="text-align:center; float:left; margin-right:1em;"
|-
!colspan=3 |Matchday 9
|-
!width="170"|Home Team
!width="60"|Result
!width="170"|Away Team

{| class="wikitable" style="text-align:center; float:left; margin-right:1em;"
|-
!colspan=3 |Matchday 10
|-
!width="170"|Home Team
!width="60"|Result
!width="170"|Away Team

{| class="wikitable" style="text-align:center; float:left; margin-right:1em;"
|-
!colspan=3 |Matchday 11
|-
!width="170"|Home Team
!width="60"|Result
!width="170"|Away Team

{| class="wikitable" style="text-align:center; float:left; margin-right:1em;"
|-
!colspan=3 |Matchday 12
|-
!width="170"|Home Team
!width="60"|Result
!width="170"|Away Team

{| class="wikitable" style="text-align:center; float:left; margin-right:1em;"
|-
!colspan=3 |Matchday 13
|-
!width="170"|Home Team
!width="60"|Result
!width="170"|Away Team

{| class="wikitable" style="text-align:center; float:left; margin-right:1em;"
|-
!colspan=3 |Matchday 14
|-
!width="170"|Home Team
!width="60"|Result
!width="170"|Away Team
|-

{| class="wikitable" style="text-align:center; float:left; margin-right:1em;"
|-
!colspan=3 |Matchday 15
|-
!width="170"|Home Team
!width="60"|Result
!width="170"|Away Team

{| class="wikitable" style="text-align:center; float:left; margin-right:1em;"
|-
!colspan=3 |Matchday 16
|-
!width="170"|Home Team
!width="60"|Result
!width="170"|Away Team

{| class="wikitable" style="text-align:center; float:left; margin-right:1em;"
|-
!colspan=3 |Matchday 17
|-
!width="170"|Home Team
!width="60"|Result
!width="170"|Away Team

{| class="wikitable" style="text-align:center; float:left; margin-right:1em;"
|-
!colspan=3 |Matchday 18
|-
!width="170"|Home Team
!width="60"|Result
!width="170"|Away Team
|-

{| class="wikitable" style="text-align:center; float:left; margin-right:1em;"
|-
!colspan=3 |Matchday 19
|-
!width="170"|Home Team
!width="60"|Result
!width="170"|Away Team
|-

{| class="wikitable" style="text-align:center; float:left; margin-right:1em;"
|-
!colspan=3 |Matchday 20
|-
!width="170"|Home Team
!width="60"|Result
!width="170"|Away Team

{| class="wikitable" style="text-align:center; float:left; margin-right:1em;"
|-
!colspan=3 |Matchday 21
|-
!width="170"|Home Team
!width="60"|Result
!width="170"|Away Team

{| class="wikitable" style="text-align:center; float:left; margin-right:1em;"
|-
!colspan=3 |Matchday 22
|-
!width="170"|Home Team
!width="60"|Result
!width="170"|Away Team

Top scorers

See also
 2007 in Paraguayan football

References

External links
 Asociación Paraguaya de Fútbol Website
 Paraguay 2007 at RSSSF

Apertura